The 2005 Senior League World Series took place from August 13–20 in Bangor, Maine, United States. Urbandale, Iowa defeated Pearl City, Hawaii in the championship game.

Teams

Results

Group A

Group B

Elimination Round

References

Senior League World Series
Senior League World Series